Hollybush is a grade II listed building on Hadley Green Road to the north of Chipping Barnet. The main house was built around 1790 and the adjoining small buildings on the left (since altered) even earlier.

References

External links

Grade II listed buildings in the London Borough of Barnet
Houses in the London Borough of Barnet
Monken Hadley